The Batiscan Lake is located in Upper Batiscanie and is the limit of unorganized territories of Lac-Blanc (White Lake) and Lac-Croche. This territory is related to the La Jacques-Cartier Regional County Municipality, in the administrative region of the Capitale-Nationale, in the province of Quebec, Canada.

Shape while length (6.35 km by 0.5 km at the widest in the East-West direction), the Batiscan lake marks the southwestern boundary of the Laurentides Wildlife Reserve and the northeastern boundary of the Zec de la Rivière-Blanche.

Shaped in length, in the East-West direction, the size of the lake is 6.35 km by 0.5 km at the widest. The Batiscan Lake mark the southwest boundary of the Laurentides Wildlife Reserve and the northeastern boundary of the Zec de la Rivière-Blanche.

Fueled mainly by the Croche River (La Tuque) coming from northeast, Batiscan lake drains into the Lightning River which joins  to the west, the Batiscan River. The Croche River (La Tuque) is powered by the Lac Croche.

The Moïse River, coming from the north, flows into the Lightning River just at the mouth of Lake Batiscan. The Moïse River is powered by Moïse Lake which in turn is fed by three smaller rivers. The Moïse Lake marks the boundary of the southwest boundary of the Laurentides Wildlife Reserve and the north boundary of the Zec de la Rivière-Blanche.

Toponymy 
In 1873, the Surveyor Pascal Dumais Horace wrote that the heights of the lake, you could see the mountain range west of the Saint-Maurice River, the whole area of Lac-Édouard, Quebec, the valley of the Bostonnais River and that of the Métabetchouane.

The name "Batiscan Lake" was officially registered at the Commission de toponymie du Québec, as of December 5, 1968. The name "Batiscan Lake" is sometimes confused in the use of the place name "Petit Lac Batiscan", which is located in the municipality of Saint-Raymond. Batiscan lake is considered the second head of the river of the same name, especially through the Moïse River (Quebec) and other rivers that feed it. French place names in Canada, it is natural to associate the name for a lake head and toponym discharge.

See also 
 Batiscanie, Quebec
 Batiscan River
 Lightning River
 Croche River (La Tuque)
 Moïse River (Quebec)
 Portneuf Wildlife Reserve
 Laurentides Wildlife Reserve
 Zec de la Rivière-Blanche

MRC and municipalities :
 La Jacques-Cartier Regional County Municipality
 La Tuque
 Municipality of Lac-Édouard, Quebec

References 

Lakes of Mauricie
Laurentides Wildlife Reserve